Harich is a village in the Artik Municipality of the Shirak Province of Armenia. Within the village is the Harichavank Monastery of the 8th century. Across the gorge from the monastery is a 3rd millennium BC fortress and tomb field.

Demographics

Gallery

References 

 
 World Gazeteer: Armenia – World-Gazetteer.com
 
 
 

Populated places in Shirak Province
Tourist attractions in Shirak Province